Evangel Classical Christian School is a state-registered, private, K–12 Christian school in Alabaster, Alabama. It was founded in 2004 in order to provide classical Christian education.

Evangel Christian School operates under the legal and spiritual oversight of the Presbyterian Evangel Church, PCA, as a Board-directed ministry. It is a member of the Association of Classical and Christian Schools.

References

External links

Christian schools in Alabama
Classical Christian schools
Educational institutions established in 2004
Private elementary schools in Alabama
Private high schools in Alabama
Private middle schools in Alabama
Schools in Shelby County, Alabama
Presbyterian Church in America
2004 establishments in Alabama
Presbyterian schools in the United States